Park Ji-young is a Korean name consisting of the family name Park and the given name Ji-young, and may also refer to:

 Park Ji-young (actress) (born 1968), South Korean actress
 Park Ji-yeong (judoka) (born 1971), South Korean judoka
 Park Ji-young, birth name of the singer Kahi

See also
Park Jin-young (disambiguation)